Anita Włodarczyk (born 8 August 1985) is a Polish hammer thrower. She is the 2012, 2016 and 2020 Olympic champion, and the first woman in history to throw the hammer over 80 m; she currently holds the women's world record of 82.98 m. She is considered the greatest women's hammer thrower of all time.

Career
Włodarczyk won her first national U23 championships in 2007, and went on to compete in the 2007 European Athletics U23 Championships, although she did not progress beyond the qualifying round. She finished sixth in the hammer throw competition at the 2008 Olympic Games.

Włodarczyk qualified for the 2008 World Athletics Final and won a bronze medal. The following year, she took part in the 2009 European Team Championships, winning her first gold medal at a major international competition.

Prior to the 2009 World Championships in Athletics, she produced a national record-breaking performance in Cottbus, winning the competition with a world-leading  throw. This was fourth longest throw by a woman in hammer throw.

Her season ended prematurely when she twisted her left ankle during her celebration. Returning to competition at the Meeting Grand Prix IAAF de Dakar in April 2010, she easily won her event with a throw of 75.13 m. She then proceeded to break her existing world record with a  hammer throw at the Enea Cup in Bydgoszcz on 6 June 2010. She won the bronze at the 2010 European Athletics Championships and was ranked second overall for the season in the IAAF Hammer Throw Challenge, finishing behind Betty Heidler. She finished outside of the medals at the 2011 World Championships in Athletics, coming fifth overall.

In 2012, Włodarczyk finished third at the Ostrava Golden Spike and was the runner-up at the Prefontaine Classic. At the 2012 Summer Olympics, she won the silver medal with a throw of 77.60 m. On 11 October 2016, she was retroactively awarded gold after Russia's Tatyana Lysenko was stripped of the medal after testing positive in reanalysis of her stored doping samples.

In 2014, Włodarczyk won the European Championship with a throw of 78.76, which was a championship and national record.

On 28 August 2016, she threw , setting a new world record just two weeks after the Olympics at the EAA 7th Kamila Skolimowska Memorial in Warsaw. In competition, Włodarczyk uses some of the equipment that belonged to the late Skolimowska, as a tribute to her fellow hammer thrower.

In 2014, 2016 and 2017 she was given Track & Field News Athlete of the Year award.

In 2017, she received Polish Sportspersonality of the Year Award for her sports achievements in the previous year. She finished the year with a 42 contests winning streak which began in July 2014.

, she holds all of the top 15 women's hammer throw results and 27 out of the top 30.

At the 2020 Summer Olympics, she won the hammer throw event with a throw of 78.48 m. Włodarczyk is the only woman to ever win this event three times in a row (in the men's competition, only John Flanagan did so, winning the event at the 1900, 1904 and 1908 Summer Olympics). She is also the first woman to win a specific individual athletics event three times in a row at the Olympic Games. With three Olympic gold medals, she ranks third in the all-time medal table among Polish athletes who competed at the Summer Olympics, behind racewalker Robert Korzeniowski and sprinter Irena Szewińska.

Awards and accolades
For her sport achievements, she received:
 Knight's Cross of the Order of Polonia Restituta (5th Class) in 2009.

In 2021 Mattel announced the creation of a Shero Barbie doll with Włodarczyk's image for her “inspiration to others” in pursuing their dreams. She became the third Polish woman to have one after Martyna Wojciechowska and Iwona Blecharczyk.

International competitions

References

External links

1985 births
Living people
People from Rawicz
Sportspeople from Greater Poland Voivodeship
Skra Warszawa athletes
Polish female hammer throwers
Olympic athletes of Poland
Olympic gold medalists for Poland
Athletes (track and field) at the 2008 Summer Olympics
Athletes (track and field) at the 2012 Summer Olympics
Athletes (track and field) at the 2016 Summer Olympics
Medalists at the 2012 Summer Olympics
Medalists at the 2016 Summer Olympics
World Athletics Championships athletes for Poland
World Athletics Championships medalists
European Athletics Championships medalists
World Athletics record holders
Knights of the Order of Polonia Restituta
Olympic gold medalists in athletics (track and field)
Olympic female hammer throwers
Track & Field News Athlete of the Year winners
World Athletics Championships winners
European Athletics Championships winners
IAAF Continental Cup winners
Polish Athletics Championships winners
Athletes (track and field) at the 2020 Summer Olympics
Medalists at the 2020 Summer Olympics